Abida attenuata is a species of air-breathing land snail, a terrestrial pulmonate gastropod mollusc in the family Chondrinidae.

Geographic distribution
Abida attenuata is found only in two disjunct populations, one in the Eastern Pyrenees in France, and one in the Basque Country in Spain.

Ecology 
Abida attenuata is a rock-dwelling species of land snail. It lives on limestone.

References

Sources
  Kerney, M.P., Cameron, R.A.D. & Jungbluth, J-H. (1983). Die Landschnecken Nord- und Mitteleuropas. Ein Bestimmungsbuch für Biologen und Naturfreunde, 384 pp., 24 plates. [Summer or later]. Hamburg / Berlin (Paul Parey). page(s): 292
 Bank, R. A.; Neubert, E. (2017). Checklist of the land and freshwater Gastropoda of Europe. Last update: July 16, 2017

External links
 

Chondrinidae
Gastropods of Europe
Gastropods described in 1886